Masti Three is a Punjabi music album and the fourth studio album by Kamal Heer released in 2006 on Plasma Records. Music composition was by Sangtar and lyrics were by Mangal Hathur and S M Sadiq.

Track listing

Personal 
 Singer: Kamal Heer
 Music: Sangtar
 Lyrics: Mangal Hathur and S M Sadiq
 Recorded, Mixed and Mastered at: Grind Music and Sound Studios, Los Angeles
 Mixed and Mastered by: Michelle Garuik
 Back Vocals: Manmohan Waris and Sangtar
 Rhythm and Misc Overdubs by: Joy & Atul at Super Track Studios, Ludhiana and Hari Om at Deepika Studios, New Delhi
 Music Video Director: Sandeep Sharma
 Musicians: Danesh Kumar, Kuki, Sadiq, Sonu, Prashant Kumar, Rakesh, Tinka, Karishan Murari, Hari Om, Ghulam Ali, Rajinder Prasad and Sangtar

Awards 
Masti Three's title track "Gaaia Na Kar Ni" received Best Lyricist Award for Mangal Hathur at the 2007 ETC Punjabi Music Awards also known as The 4th Annual Punjabi Music Awards.

References 

Waris Brothers
Kamal Heer albums
2006 albums